Guten Morgen Freiheit (Good Morning Freedom) is the seventh studio album by German recording artist Yvonne Catterfeld. Released on 10 March 2017, it marked Catterfeld's debut release with her independent record company Veritable Records following her departure from Columbia Records. Her highest-charting album since Unterwegs (2005), it debuted at number four on the Austrian and German Albums Chart, respectively, and peaked at number seven in Switzerland.

Track listing

Charts

Release history

References

External links
 YvonneCatterfeld.com — official site

2017 albums
Yvonne Catterfeld albums